Hycanthone is the schistosomicide approved by the FDA in 1975.  It is a metabolite of lucanthone. Hycanthone interferes with parasite nerve function, resulting in paralysis and death. This agent also intercalates into DNA and inhibits RNA synthesis in vitro and shows potential antineoplastic activity.

Anti-schistosomal activity
Hycanthone is shown to be an effective inhibitor of acetylcholinesterase (AChE) from Schistosoma mansoni, but is less potential against AChE from mammalian origin. This might come from differences in the configuration of active center between schistosome and mammalian AChE enzymes.

Hycanthone is shown to intercalates into DNA and inhibit RNA synthesis in vitro. A growing body of evidence has shown that hycathone has an antineoplastic activity.

Clinical trials
 Phase II Study of Chemotherapy with Hycanthone for Advanced Colorectal Carcinoma.
 Phase II Chemotherapy with Hycanthone Mesylate and Flagyl for Advanced Malignant Lymphomas (Completed)

Physical properties

References 

Antiparasitic agents
Thioxanthones
Diethylamino compounds